TS State of Maine is the current training ship of the Maine Maritime Academy. Formerly in United States Navy service as the USNS Tanner (T-AGS-40), she assumed her present name and role in June 1997.

History

Previous ships
Several ships have borne the name State of Maine since the Maine Maritime Academy was founded in 1941.

Current TS State of Maine

USNS Tanner (T-AGS-40), was built for the United States Navy as a fast oceanographic research vessel by Bethlehem Steel Corporation at its Sparrows Point Yard in Maryland in 1990.  The vessel was the second oceanographic research ship to bear the name of Zera Luther Tanner, a noted oceanographer and inventor of a patented sounding machine.  The vessel experienced catastrophic engine failure in 1993 and was laid up by the Navy and eventually transferred ownership to the Maritime Administration (MARAD).

The ship lay idle in the James River Reserve Fleet until 1996 when she began a conversion process, which removed her underwater sonar domes and equipment.  The two original engines were removed and a new power plant was installed.  The newer engine is significantly less powerful than the old engines.  The sister ship, Maury (T-AGS-39), now the third vessel of the name TS Golden Bear, retained the original and more powerful enterprise engines.

The vessel was modified to increase the accommodations from 108 to 302 persons.  New lifesaving equipment and upgrades to existing equipment were accomplished as well as enhancements to the habitability requirements of the vessel.  She was delivered to Maine Maritime Academy on 6 June 1997 and sailed her maiden training cruise the following week.

State of Maine was called into active duty by the Maritime Administration (MARAD) following Hurricane Katrina and provided living quarters for oil rig workers, who were working to repair damaged rigs, and for Federal Law Enforcement Officers assisting in New Orleans.

Vessel information

The ship is normally docked at her pier in Castine when not on a training cruise or in drydock. State of Maine is classed with the American Bureau of Shipping, and all inspections of her hull and equipment are undertaken by this classification society. The ship entered drydock for scheduled maintenance and inspections following the summer cruise of 2007. She also entered drydock following the Summer Cruise of 2012, keeping within the inspection schedule required by US Coast Guard Regulations. Most recently, she entered drydock at the conclusion of her 2017 summer cruise. She was observed in the dry dock at South Boston MA undergoing repairs during the first week of July 2022 before she returned to service in November of 2022. 

As a National Security Multi-Mission Vessel, the State of Maine is scheduled to be replaced in late 2024 by a new ship under construction in Philadelphia.

Sister ship 
State of Maines sister ship is TS Golden Bear, the training ship of the California Maritime Academy.  Golden Bear was formerly USNS Maury.

References

External links
  U.S. Maritime Administration

 

1990 ships
Training ships of the United States